Bayannur Tianjitai Airport  is an airport serving the city of Bayannur in Inner Mongolia Autonomous Region, China.  It is located in the town of Tianjitai in Wuyuan County, 33 kilometers from the city center.  Construction began on 26 January 2010 with a total investment of 360 million yuan, and the airport was opened on 30 December 2011.

Facilities
The airport has a runway that is 2,600 meters long and 45 meters wide (class 4C), a 7,076 square-meter terminal building, and three aircraft parking bays.  It is designed to handle 230,000 passengers and 810 tons of cargo annually by 2020.

Airlines and destinations

The airport is served by the following airlines:

Statistics

See also
List of airports in China
List of the busiest airports in China

References

Airports in Inner Mongolia
Airports established in 2011
2011 establishments in China